Auzata semilucida is a moth in the family Drepanidae. It was described by Hong-Fu Chu and Lin-Yao Wang in 1988. It is found in Sichuan, China.

The length of the forewings is 9–10 mm. Adults have a large translucent patch on the hindwings.

References

Moths described in 1988
Drepaninae
Moths of Asia